This article lists events from the year 2017 in Oman.

Incumbents
Sultan: Qaboos bin Said al Said

Deaths
5 February – Rahila Al Riyami, politician (b. 1960).

References

External links

 
2010s in Oman
Years of the 21st century in Oman
Oman
Oman